Asota circularis is a moth of the family Erebidae first described by Reich in 1938. It is found in Papua New Guinea.

External links
 Species info

Asota (moth)
Moths of New Guinea
Moths described in 1938